The 1965 Colorado Buffaloes football team was an American football team that represented the University of Colorado as a member of the Big Eight Conference during the 1965 NCAA University Division football season. Led by third-year head coach Eddie Crowder, the Buffaloes compiled an overall record of 6–2–2 with a mark of 4–2–1 in conference play, placing third in the Big 8. Colorado played their home games on campus at Folsom Field in Boulder, Colorado.

This was Colorado's first winning season in four years, following three consecutive 2–8 records; they beat Oklahoma for the first time under Crowder, who was previously a Sooner assistant (and player).

Schedule

References

External links
 Sports-Reference – 1965 Colorado Buffaloes

Colorado
Colorado Buffaloes football seasons
Colorado Buffaloes football